Sletten is a surname. Notable people with the surname include:

Finn Sletten (born 1952), Norwegian jazz musician
Iver Sletten (born 1974), Norwegian footballer
Jakob Hveding Sletten (1872–1936), Norwegian priest and musician
Klaus Sletten (1877–1946), Norwegian organizational worker and politician
Olaf Sletten (1886–1943), Norwegian shooter
Vegard Sletten (1907–1984), Norwegian newspaper editor
Paige VanZant, born Paige Sletten, (1994), MMA fighter and professional wrestler, maiden name was Sletten.

See also
Sletten Township, Polk County, Minnesota